7641 Cteatus, provisional designation: , is a large Jupiter trojan from the Greek camp, approximately  in diameter. It was discovered on 5 October 1986, by Slovak astronomer Milan Antal at the Toruń Centre for Astronomy in Piwnice, Poland. The dark D-type asteroid is notably inclined and has longer-than-average rotation period of 27.8 hours. It belongs to the 50 largest Jupiter trojans. It was named from Greek mythology for Cteatus, the conjoined twin and father of Amphimachus.

Orbit and classification 

Cteatus is a dark Jovian asteroid orbiting in the leading Greek camp at Jupiter's  Lagrangian point, 60° ahead of its orbit in a 1:1 resonance (see Trojans in astronomy). It is also a non-family asteroid in the Jovian background population.

It orbits the Sun at a distance of 4.9–5.5 AU once every 11 years and 11 months (4,350 days; semi-major axis of 5.21 AU). Its orbit has an eccentricity of 0.05 and a notably high inclination of 35° with respect to the ecliptic. The body's observation arc begins with its official discovery observation at the Toruń Centre.

Numbering and naming 

This minor planet was numbered by the Minor Planet Center on 22 May 1997. On 14 May 2021, the object was named by the Working Group Small Body Nomenclature (WGSBN), after Cteatus from Greek mythology, who had a conjoined twin. His son Amphimachus was one of the leaders of the Elean contingent in the Trojan War.

Physical Characteristics 

In the SDSS-based taxonomy, Cteatus is a dark D-type asteroid. It has also been characterized as a D-type by Pan-STARRS survey. Its V–I color index of 0.98 agrees with that of most Jovian D-type asteroids.

Rotation period 

In October 2009, a rotational lightcurve of Cteatus was obtained from photometric observations by Italian astronomer Stefano Mottola at the Calar Alto Observatory in Spain. Lightcurve analysis gave a well-defined rotation period of 27.770 hours with a brightness amplitude of 0.40 magnitude. While not being a slow rotator, its period is significantly longer than that of most larger Jupiter trojans, which have a spin rate of typically 10 hours. The body's relatively high brightness variation of 0.40 magnitude is also indicative of a non-spherical shape.

Diameter and albedo 

According to the surveys carried out by the Infrared Astronomical Satellite IRAS, the Japanese Akari satellite and the NEOWISE mission of NASA's Wide-field Infrared Survey Explorer, this asteroid measures between 68.97 and 75.28 kilometers in diameter and its surface has an albedo between 0.062 and 0.071. The Collaborative Asteroid Lightcurve Link derives an albedo of 0.0647 and a diameter of 68.89 kilometers based on an absolute magnitude of 9.4.

References

External links 
 Asteroid Lightcurve Database (LCDB), query form (info )
 Discovery Circumstances: Numbered Minor Planets (5001)-(10000) – Minor Planet Center
 
 

007641
Discoveries by Milan Antal
Named minor planets
19861005